Palm Beach International Airport  is a public airport in Palm Beach County, Florida, located just west of the city of West Palm Beach, Florida, United States, which it serves as the primary airport for. It is also the primary airport for most of Palm Beach County, serving the suburbs and cities of Wellington, Delray Beach, Boynton Beach, Jupiter, and Palm Beach Gardens. It is the third busiest airport in the Miami metropolitan area after Miami International Airport and Fort Lauderdale–Hollywood International Airport. The airport is operated by Palm Beach County's Department of Airports. Road access to the airport is direct from I-95, Southern Boulevard, and Congress Avenue. The airport is bordered on the west by Military Trail.

History
Palm Beach International Airport began operations in 1936 as Morrison Field. It was named in honor of Grace Morrison, a key participant in the planning and organization of the airfield. The first flight departing the field was a New York bound DC-2 operated by Eastern Air Lines in 1936. The airport was dedicated on December 19, 1936.

In 1937, the airport expanded beyond an airstrip and an administration building when the Palm Beach Aero Corporation obtained a lease, built hangars and the first terminal on the south side of the airport. The new terminal was known as the Eastern Air Lines Terminal.

The field was used by the U.S. Army Air Forces during World War II. Following the attack on Pearl Harbor, Morrison Field was used for training and later as a staging base for the Allied invasion of France, with numerous aircraft departing Morrison en route to the United Kingdom to take part in the D-Day invasion of Normandy. Morrison Field was a stopover for flights to and from India, via Brazil and West Africa.

In 1947, the newly established U.S. Air Force returned Morrison Field to Palm Beach County. The name was changed to Palm Beach International Airport in 1948.

The airport was again used by the U.S. Air Force in 1951 and renamed Palm Beach Air Force Base under the control of the Military Air Transport Service (MATS). USAF operations occupied the north half of the airfield while civil operations and the airline terminal used the south half. MATS used the base for training with the host unit being the 1707th Air Transport Wing (Heavy), and its 1740th Heavy Transport Training Unit. The 1707 ATW was known as the "University of MATS", becoming the primary USAF training unit for all Air Force personnel supporting and flying heavy transport aircraft. These included C-124 Globemaster II, C-118 Liftmaster, C-97 Stratofreighter, and C-54 Skymaster maintenance training along with aircrew and transition pilot training. Nearly 23,000 airmen trained at Palm Beach AFB during the Korean War.

The Air Weather Service used Palm Beach AFB as headquarters for hurricane research, flying the first WB-50D Superfortress "Hurricane Hunter" aircraft from the base in 1956.

After several years of Palm Beach County fighting the Air Force presence in West Palm Beach, the Air Force started to close down operations there. The 1707 ATW was inactivated on June 30, 1959, and reassigned to Tinker AFB, Oklahoma. With the wing's departure, Palm Beach County took over airfield operations. The Air Force retained a small presence at the base with the 9th Weather Group becoming the main operational unit at Palm Beach AFB, performing hurricane and weather research for the Air Weather Service. The Air Photographic and Charting Service (APCS) moved its 1370th Photo-Mapping Wing to the base, performing geodetic survey flights. The Air Force finally closed Palm Beach AFB in 1962, and all property was conveyed to Palm Beach International Airport the same year.

Delta Air Lines began scheduled flights in 1959 and Capital Airlines in 1960. The first turbine-powered flights were Eastern Airlines Lockheed L-188 Electras in 1959, and Eastern DC-8 nonstops to Idlewild started in December 1960.

Air Force One was a frequent visitor to PBI during John F. Kennedy's presidency in the early 1960s. Local voters defeated a proposal to relocate the airport around this time, instead choosing to expand the existing facilities. In October 1966, an eight-gate Main Terminal opened on the northeast side of the airport; in 1974 Delta Air Lines moved into its own six-gate terminal with the airport's first jetways. The Federal Aviation Administration (FAA) built a new Air Traffic Control Tower on the south side of the airport during this period.

By the mid-1970s, the airport's dominant carriers were Delta, Eastern and National. Eastern operated the airport's only widebody service at the time, daily L-1011s to New York JFK and Newark. By 1979, National operated daily DC-10 service to JFK, LaGuardia and Miami, while Eastern operated L-1011s to Atlanta and Delta operated L-1011s to Tampa. By 1985, eight widebodies a day flew between PBI and the three New York airports.

The 25-gate David McCampbell Terminal, named for a World War II naval flying ace, was dedicated in 1988. In 2003, the terminal was voted among the finest in the nation by readers of Conde Nast Traveler Magazine. In that year, a new landscaped I-95 interchange was built to decrease traffic on Southern Boulevard (US 98) extending Turnage Boulevard (the road around the perimeter of the concourse).

Competition from rapidly expanding Fort Lauderdale-Hollywood International Airport cut growth at the airport in the 1990s. The 2001 recession and the September 11 terrorist attacks further inhibited growth, but development in South Florida since 2002 has finally led to a surge of passenger traffic at the airport. In addition, discount carriers such as JetBlue and Southwest Airlines began service to PBI. In 2006, the county embarked on an interim expansion program by breaking ground on a 7-story parking garage and the addition of 3 gates in Concourse C. Long range expansions include gates at Concourse B and the eventual construction of a new 14 gate Concourse D to be extended east from the present terminal.

Following the 2016 election of Donald Trump as President of the United States, Air Force One again became a frequent visitor to PBI, typically parking on the south side of the airport near Southern Boulevard while Trump visited his nearby Mar-a-Lago estate. Until 2017, a line of school buses was used as a temporary barrier between the aircraft and onlookers. Palm Beach County stated that it would erect a more permanent barrier system in mid-2017, but the school buses were still in use as of November.

Facilities

10L-28R: 10,001 x 150 ft. (3,048 x 46 m) Asphalt
10R-28L: 3,214 x 75 ft. (980 x 23 m) Asphalt
14–32: 6,931 x 150 ft. (2,113 x 46 m) Asphalt

The airport's runway designations were changed by the FAA to their current configuration on December 17, 2009. Previously, they had been 9L-27R, 9R-27L, and 13–31.

PBI Airport has 32 gates (28 jetway gates, 4 hardstands). As of 2018, Concourse A has 4 hardstand gates and houses Bahamasair and Silver Airways. Concourse B has 13 jetway gates and houses Air Canada, American Airlines, Southwest Airlines, Sun Country Airlines, and United Airlines. Concourse C has 15 gates and holds Delta Air Lines, Frontier Airlines, JetBlue, and Spirit Airlines.

Control tower
A new  Airport Traffic Control tower is active on the north side of the airport (west of concourse A, off Belvedere Rd.) along with a single-story,  ATBM Base Building. The current tower lies on the southern side of the airport.

Helicopters
Helicopter operations typically use 10R/28L or its parallel taxiways or make a direct approach to either Customs or the Galaxy Aviation ramp.
Palm Beach County Sheriffs Office (PBSO) maintains its air division from a hangar at the southwest corner of the airport.
Health Care District of Palm Beach County operates the Traumahawk with Palm Beach County Fire-Rescue from a hangar at the southwest corner of the airport, next to PBSO.

Other hangars
General Aviation fixed-base operator (FBO) and hangars are located along the southern edge of the airport, with entrance access available by the Jet Aviation FBO. Other FBOs at PBI include Atlantic Aviation and Signature Flight Support.

Fire protection and emergency medical services
The Palm Beach County Fire Rescue Aviation Battalion is located between runways at PBI. The fire station which is located near the center of the airport grounds, is home to 13 pieces of specialized fire fighting equipment.

These apparatus include:
An air stair which allows for assistance in deplaning in an emergency
Five airport crash tenders that go by the call sign Dragon (Dragon 1, Dragon 2, etc.)
A foam unit that carries Purple-K concentrate to assist with extinguishing a fire
A heavy rescue vehicle that carries additional tools for plane crashes and other mass-casualty incidents

Trauma Hawk

The Trauma Hawk Station, which is located at the south west corner of the airport, Palm Beach County Fire Rescue has two Sikorsky S-76C helos. The department partners with the Palm Beach County Health Care District to operate the Trauma Hawk Aero-Medical Program. The Trauma Hawk program, which was established in November 1990, replaced the use of Palm Beach County Sheriff's Office helicopters to medevac critically injured patients to area hospitals. Air ambulances are identically equipped and can carry two patients each and up to four medical attendants if needed. Each helicopter is staffed with a pilot, a registered nurse (RN) and a paramedic. The nurses and paramedics are Palm Beach County Fire Rescue employees while the pilots are Health Care District employees.

Airlines and destinations

Passenger

Cargo

Destinations map

Statistics

Top destinations

Airline market share

Annual traffic

Ground transportation

Rail
Palm Beach International Airport is near the West Palm Beach Brightline Station served by Brightline and the West Palm Beach train station served by Amtrak intercity trains and Tri-Rail commuter trains. The latter no longer provides a shuttle bus service from the station to the airport.

Road
Palm Tran buses No. 40 and No. 44 serve the airport. Both provide connections to the Amtrak/Tri-Rail West Palm Beach train station. The station is also served by Greyhound buses.

Controversies
Ground traffic controllers, and approach controllers whose sector is within  of the runway would have remained at PBIA. The FAA cited the move as a cost-cutting measure, but critics say that it creates a risk to South Florida air traffic if the Miami facility is damaged in a hurricane or a terrorist attack. The National Air Traffic Controllers Association opposed the move. The remote facility at Miami International Airport houses air traffic controllers for Miami and Fort Lauderdale international airports.

Donald Trump sued to block the expansion of one of the runways at PBIA in 2010. In 2015, he initiated a $100 million lawsuit over the flight path that passes over his Mar-a-Lago estate. He dropped the lawsuit in 2016 after his presidential victory ensured some type of no fly zone over his property.

Accidents and incidents
On August 21, 1956, a USAF Douglas C-124C Globemaster II crashed during its initial climb at then Palm Beach Air Force Base when a prop cuff came off an engine and went through the fuselage, cutting control cables, the aircraft banked to the right and crashed into a tree nursery, three out of the six occupants were killed.
On January 30, 2008, American Airlines Flight 1738, a Boeing 757 flying from Luis Muñoz Marín International Airport in San Juan, Puerto Rico, to Philadelphia International Airport, had to make an emergency landing in West Palm Beach after the captain reported smoke in the cockpit. Of the 137 passengers and seven crewmembers, one passenger and five crewmembers were taken to the hospital, including the captain and the first officer.
On November 11, 2010, a Piper PA-44 Seminole flying from Palm Beach International Airport to Melbourne Orlando International Airport crashed on a taxiway after an engine failed during takeoff. The plane was operated by Florida Institute of Technology's College of Aeronautics and all four aboard—two FIT flight students, a flight instructor, and a passenger—were killed.
On October 25, 2012, Spirit Airlines Flight 946, an Airbus A319 flying from Rafael Núñez International Airport in Cartagena, Colombia, to Fort Lauderdale International Airport, had made an emergency landing after engine No. 2 had failed on the aircraft. The plane had landed safely, and there was no damage to the plane or injuries reported.
On March 24, 2014, Delta Airlines Flight 2014, a McDonnell Douglas MD-90 flying from Hartsfield–Jackson Atlanta International Airport to Palm Beach International Airport, had declared an emergency due to a hydraulic problem and made an emergency landing on runway 28R. There was no damage to the plane and there were no injuries.
On July 21, 2016, American Airlines Flight 1822, an Airbus A319 flying from Palm Beach International Airport to Philadelphia International Airport experienced a hydraulic fluid leak while taxiing for departure. Passengers exited the aircraft via emergency slides. Seventeen people were treated for various injuries.
On May 10, 2022, a Cessna 208 Caravan with two passengers aboard en route from Marsh Harbour Airport in the Bahamas to Treasure Coast International Airport in Fort Pierce, Florida, made an emergency landing at Palm Beach International Airport. After the pilot fell ill and lost consciousness, passenger Darren Harrison took control and called the tower at Treasure Coast International. Robert Morgan, an air traffic controller and a certified flight instructor, guided Harrison, who had no flying experience, to land safely at Palm Beach. The pilot who collapsed was hospitalized and his condition later stabilized. Neither passenger was injured.
On January 24, 2023, an alleged bomb threat aboard a Frontier Airlines flight prompted authorities to evacuate the Concourse C of the airport. A passenger made a statement that there was a bomb in his bags. The passenger who made the threat was arrested by the FBI.

See also

Florida World War II Army Airfields
List of airports in Florida
Transportation in South Florida

References

External links
Palm Beach International Airport, official site
Terminal Map with airlines
Palm Beach International Airport 1966–1988

1936 establishments in Florida
Airports in Florida
Airports established in 1936
Airports in Palm Beach County, Florida